The Fenghuang is a mythological bird of East Asia similar to the Phoenix.

Fenghuang may also refer to:

 Fenghuang, Miluo (凤凰乡), a township in Miluo City, Hunan province, China
 Fenghuang Airport (disambiguation)
 Fenghuang County, in Hunan, China
 Fenghuang Mountain (disambiguation), several mountains in China
 Shanghai SH760, a 1958 car originally called 'Fenghuang'
 Fenghuang, a villain in Kung Fu Panda: Legends of Awesomeness

See also
 Fenghuangcheng Subdistrict, a subdistrict of Fengcheng, Liaoning, China